Canalipalpata, also known as bristle-footed annelids or fan-head worms, is an order of polychaete worms, with 31 families in it including the suborder Sabellida (families Serpulidae (tubeworms) and Sabellidae (fanworms and feather duster worms) and the Alvinellidae, a family of deep-sea worms associated with hydrothermal vents.

The Canalipalpata have no teeth or jaws. Most are filter feeders. They have grooved palpi, which are covered in cilia. These cilia are used to transport food particles to the mouth. However, the cilia and grooves have been lost in the Siboglinidae family.

Fossil record
The earliest known member of the Canalipalpata is Terebellites franklini, which was found in the Clouds Rapids Formation of Newfoundland, and dates from the mid Cambrian (St David's series).

Use in aquaria
Many species of Canalipalpata are visually attractive. Fanworms and Christmas tree worms (a type of serpulid) are recommended as species for beginners to keep in a marine aquarium.

Taxonomy
Order Canalipalpata
 Suborder Sabellida
 Family Oweniidae
 Family Sabellariidae
 Family Sabellidae (Feather duster worms)
 Family Serpulidae
 Family Siboglinidae (Beard worms)
 Family Spirorbidae
 Suborder Spionida
 Family Apistobranchidae
 Family Chaetophteridae
 Family Longosomatidae
 Family Magelonidae
 Family Poecilochaetidae
 Family Spionidae
 Family Trochochaetidae
 Family Uncispionidae
 Suborder Terebellida
 Family Acrocirridae
 Family Alvinellidae
 Family Ampharetidae
 Family Cirratulidae
 Family Ctenodrilidae
 Family Fauveliopsidae
 Family Flabelligeridae
 Family Flotidae
 Family Pectinariidae (Trumpet worms)
 Family Poeobiidae
 Family Sternaspidae
 Family Terebellidae (Spaghetti worms)
 Family Trichobranchidae
 Incertae sedis
 Family Polygordiidae
 Family Protodrilidae
 Family Protodriloididae
 Family Saccocirridae

References

External links
 Encyclopedia of Life: http://www.eol.org/pages/124?category_id=226
 Images from the canalipalpata order: http://zipcodezoo.com/index.php/Canalipalpata

 
Protostome orders